Formerly
Music City Mall, originally Vista Ridge Mall, is a shopping mall in Lewisville, Texas, United States, owned and managed by 1000 South Vermont LLC. Opened in 1989, it is located on the southwest corner of Round Grove Road and the portion of Interstate 35E known as Stemmons Freeway. As of October 2022, the mall contains 116 businesses. The current anchors are Dillard's Clearance, Cinemark, and Zion Market. The mall contains two vacant anchors, a former JCPenney and a former Macy's.

History
 

Music City Mall opened on October 4, 1989, as Vista Ridge Mall, with Sears and Dillard's as the initial anchors. By March 1990, the mall was 65% leased, and an additional 19 stores had opened, including The Gap, Casual Corner, and The Limited. The mall added a third anchor when JCPenney opened its Vista Ridge Mall location on August 1, 1990. The fourth anchor to open was Foley's, a unit of May Department Stores, as part of an expansion push by the chain. The store held its dedication in 1991.

In 1991, the mall underwent interior renovations to make the indoor areas more appealing.

When Vista Ridge Mall opened in 1989, it included a 12-screen Cinemark theater, whose marquee and ticket office were in the center court of the mall. In 2006, Cinemark constructed an attached 15-screen movie theater, which contains entrances both inside and outside the mall, and relocated there upon completion. The original theater has since remained unused.

Foley's was rebranded as Macy's in September 2006, as part of Federated Department Stores acquisition and rebranding of May Department Stores.

On December 9, 2013, Vista Ridge Mall was featured in an episode of the TLC series, Bakery Boss. On March 23, 2014, the mall was featured in an episode of the Food Network series, Food Court Wars.

In October 2017, the mall was sold in a live auction to Texas businessman John Bushman of ICA Properties, which owns Music City Mall, Odessa. Upon the purchase, Vista Ridge Mall was renamed Music City Mall, Lewisville. ICA Properties later unveiled a monument inside the mall featuring the Ten Commandments, which they have a tradition of doing at all of their properties.

On May 31, 2018, Sears announced it would be closing as part of a plan to close 72 stores nationwide. The store closed in September 2018. In August 2019, Zion Market opened its first Texas location in the former Sears.

Dillard's transitioned into a clearance location in May 2019.

On June 4, 2020, JCPenney announced it would be closing as part of a plan to close 154 stores nationwide. The store completed its liquidation on October 18, 2020.

On January 6, 2021, Macy's announced it would be closing its location in Music City Mall as part of a plan to close 46 stores nationwide. Macy's completed its liquidation on March 21, 2021, leaving Dillard's Clearance as the only traditional anchor store left.

The Freeform series, Cruel Summer, used Music City Mall as a filming location. The series began airing on April 20, 2021.

In September 2022, ICA Properties sold Music City Mall to 1000 South Vermont LLC.

Redevelopment 
Upon its purchase by ICA Properties in 2017, Vista Ridge Mall was rebranded as Music City Mall, Lewisville. The mall transitioned to a music-focused identity, and it became a key supporter of the local music and arts scene. Under this ownership, the mall featured multiple live performances seven days a week, which helped sustain local musicians. Music City Mall continued live performances during the COVID-19 pandemic, while adhering to CDC guidelines. The mall hosted several events throughout the year, such as the annual Christmas Tree Lighting ceremony, and Toycon. In 2019, the mall hosted the K-Pop Together music festival.

On March 21, 2022, the Lewisville City Council approved an agreement with the Catalyst Group to prepare for the first phases of a Music City Mall redevelopment project. The mall was then purchased by 1000 South Vermont LLC in September 2022. Upon the sale of the mall, the live performances and events were discontinued, and the Ten Commandments monument was removed. The following month, signage featuring the Music City Mall name and logo was removed from the building, although the mall remains open. Tenants and employees of the mall have been informed that the mall will once again be renamed, this time to "The Vista", although official plans and details of the redevelopment have not yet been announced to the public.

Anchors

Current:
Dillard's Clearance (opened 1989, converted to Clearance location in May 2019)
Cinemark (opened 2006, replaced original 12-screen venue in center court)
Zion Market (opened 1989 as Sears, closed September 2018, reoccupied by Zion Market in August 2019)
Former:

 JCPenney (opened 1990, closed October 18, 2020)
 Macy's (opened 1991 as Foley's, became Macy's in 2006, closed March 21, 2021)

References 

Shopping malls in the Dallas–Fort Worth metroplex
Shopping malls established in 1989
Lewisville, Texas
Buildings and structures in Denton County, Texas